The Baldwin-Coker Cottage is a historic house at 266 Lower Lake Road in Highlands, North Carolina.  The Rustic-style -story log house was designed and built in 1925 by James John Baldwin, an architect from Anderson, South Carolina.  The cottage is important as a prototype for a number of later houses that were built by members of the construction crew.  The walls are constructed of notched logs, whose ends project at random-length intervals, both at the corners of the house, and from the interior, where logs are also used to partition the inside space.  The house is topped by a side-gable wood shingle roof.  The main gable ends, and the gables of the dormers, are clad in board-and-batten siding.  A porch with naturalistic limb-and-twig railings spans the width of the main facade.

The house was listed on the National Register of Historic Places in 2003.

See also
National Register of Historic Places listings in Macon County, North Carolina

References

Houses on the National Register of Historic Places in North Carolina
Houses completed in 1925
Houses in Macon County, North Carolina
National Register of Historic Places in Macon County, North Carolina
1925 establishments in North Carolina